The British Rail Mark 5A is a type of railway vehicle in use in the UK. Fifty-two standard carriages and 14 driving trailers were built by Spanish manufacturer CAF, and all are currently operated by TransPennine Express. They first entered service on 24 August 2019.

Description

It was first announced by TransPennine Express in 2016 that they were to procure 126 new vehicles from CAF, which included 66 Mark 5A locomotive-hauled coaches. They would be formed into 13 five-carriage sets, hauled by  locomotives. This equates to 65 coaches for total service, with the 66th coach being a spare Driving Trailer. 

The sets are currently used on services between Liverpool and Scarborough as well as between Manchester Airport and Saltburn. Each set is composed of 1 first class carriage with guards area and catering provision, 1 standard class carriage with PRM toilet, 2 standard class carriages and a standard class Driving Trailer (DT). In October 2016, production started on these coaches, and in March 2017, CAF and TPE released a photo of the first completed bodyshell.

The first completed rake was sent for testing at Velim railway test circuit in March 2018, the second set being delivered straight to the UK in May 2018 via Portbury ahead of their planned entry into service in the autumn of that year. TransPennine Express have branded their new trains under the general name Nova, with the Class 68 + Mark 5A combination given the name Nova 3.

In April 2019, the first Nova 3 set was officially handed over from CAF to TPE, after a mandatory period of fault-free running.
As of 2022, 4 sets are used daily, making them the most under utilised fleets of passenger stock in the country at 5 years old.

Operation 
The first set entered service on 24 August 2019 between Liverpool Lime Street and Scarborough.

The Nova 3 was officially launched on 25 November 2019 at Liverpool Lime Street station alongside other members of the new Nova fleet.

References

Mark 5
CAF rolling stock
Train-related introductions in 2019